Kitami may refer to the following:
 3785 Kitami, an asteroid
 Kitami, Hokkaido, a city in Hokkaido, Japan
 Kitami Station (Hokkaido), a station in Kitami, Hokkaido
 Kitami Observatory, an astronomical observatory in Kitami, Hokkaido
 Kitami (train), a train service operated in Hokkaido, Japan
 Kitami Station (Tokyo), a station in Tokyo